KTFS may refer to:

 KTFS (AM), a radio station (940 AM) licensed to Texarkana, Texas, United States
 KTFS-FM, a radio station (107.1 FM) licensed to Texarkana, Arkansas, United States
 KCMC (AM), a radio station (740 AM) licensed to serve Texarkana, Texas, which held the call sign KTFS from 2014 to 2017